Abdelrahman "Abdo" Saidi (born 13 August 1999) is a Swedish footballer who plays as a winger or forward for Hammarby IF in Allsvenskan.

Early life
Saidi was born in Gothenburg, Sweden, to Algerian parents. He moved to Borås at a young age and started to play youth football with local club Norrby IF.

Club career

Norrby IF
Before the start of the 2017 season, Saidi was promoted to Norrby's first team. On 21 May, he made his debut in Superettan, Sweden's second tier, in a 2–1 away win against IFK Värnamo. On 27 May, he scored his first competitive goal for the club in a 3–0 home win against IK Frej. He ended the 2017 season making 17 league appearances, scoring twice, reportedly attracting interest from Allsvenskan clubs AIK, BK Häcken and IF Elfsborg.

On 1 August 2018, Saidi signed a new three and a half year-contract with Norrby. Throughout the season, he established himself as a starter in Superettan, making 25 appearances and scoring three goals.

In 2019, Saidi made 27 appearances, scoring four goals, as Norrby finished 9th in the Superettan table. In 2020, Saidi played 26 league games and scored seven goals, as Norrby once again avoided relegation by finishing 11th in the table.

Degerfors IF
On 8 February 2021, Saidi transferred to newly promoted Allsvenskan club Degerfors IF, signing a three-year contract. He quickly broke into Degerfors' starting eleven, scoring four goals in 29 appearances as the club finished 13th in the table, avoiding the relegation play-offs by one place.

In 2022, Degerfors initially struggled at the bottom of the Allsvenskan table, although Saidi continued as a starter for the team. On 9 May, in an away game against GIF Sundsvall, Saidi scored his first hat-trick at senior level in just ten minutes, securing a 3–2 win for his side in stoppage time. In total, Saidi made 45 competitive appearances for the club across one and a half season, scoring 11 goals.

Hammarby IF
On 11 July 2022, Saidi transferred to Hammarby IF, signing a four and a half year-contract. The transfer fee was reportedly set at around 5 million Swedish kronor.

International career
On 14 October 2019, Saidi made his debut for the Swedish U19's, in a 3–2 friendly win against Norway.

Career statistics

Club

References

1999 births
Living people
Swedish footballers
Swedish people of Algerian descent
Swedish sportspeople of African descent
Association football midfielders
Sweden youth international footballers
Norrby IF players
Degerfors IF players
Hammarby Fotboll players
Superettan players
Allsvenskan players